Tariq Iqbal (born 1964 in Nairobi, Kenya) is a former Kenyan cricketer. He has played three One Day International matches for Kenya.

His last game was their famous victory over the West Indies in the 1996 World Cup, in which he played as wicket-keeper and caught Brian Lara, for which he is best known. Before Lara's dismissal he had conceded byes and missed a catch down the leg side. Later in the innings he also caught Roger Harper.

References

1964 births
Living people
Kenyan cricketers
Kenya One Day International cricketers
Wicket-keepers